Wojciech "Wojtek" Krakowiak (born August 6, 1976 in Kielce, Poland) is a retired American football (soccer) midfielder who was the head coach of the Montana State University Billings women's soccer team.  He played professionally in Major League Soccer. He was the second assistant coach at University of Wisconsin - Green Bay for the women’s soccer team but was released of his duties in 2019. He had a short lived career as a coach at FC Bay Soccer Club in a Green Bay, Wisconsin. He is currently a technical director for United Hurricane’s in Howard, Wisconsin.

Playing career

Youth
Krakowiak moved to Clifton, New Jersey with his family in 1993, and became a United States citizen in March 2000.  He graduated from Clifton High School in 1995 and is a member of the Clifton High School Hall of Fame.  During his two seasons at Clifton, he scored seventy-nine goals, a school record.  In the fall of 1995, he entered St. John's University where a torn anterior cruciate ligament led him to redshirt his freshman season.  In 1996, he was part of the Red Storm team which won the NCAA Men's Division I Soccer Championship.  He transferred to Clemson University for his junior season where he scored thirty-one goals and added eight assists.  That year, he was selected as an All-American and won the Hermann Trophy.

Professional
Krakowiak left Clemson at the end of the season and moved to Europe where he had trials with teams in Belgium and Germany.  On February 7, 1999, the San Jose Clash selected Krakowiak in the second round (fifteenth overall) in the 1999 MLS College Draft.  Krakowiak had dropped so low in the draft because his pursuit of a European career.  He returned to the United States during the summer of 1999 to train with the Clash, but did not sign with them before returning to Europe to play in the German third division.  He also played three games with the Charleston Battery of the USL A-League in August 1999.  In February 2000, he signed with the San Jose Earthquakes, playing two seasons before being waived on June 12, 2001.  The Tampa Bay Mutiny signed him on June 30, 2001.  He played 75 minutes in an away game against the Kansas City Wizards but was waived on July 20, 2001, to make room for Danny Pena.  In 2003 and 2004, he played for the New Jersey Stallions in the Premier Development League.

Coaching career
Krakowiak coached the Kent Place School girls' and the Wayne Valley High School boys' soccer teams.  In 2006, Krakowiak served as an assistant coach with the Rutgers–Newark men's soccer team.  In November 2007, the school elevated Krakowiak to head coach of its women's soccer team.  In 2010, he served as the assistant soccer coach to the Montana State University Billings women's team. After helping to lead the team to their first ever NCAA appearance, he was promoted to head coach. The 2016 season was Krakowiak's last with Montana State University Billings. Krakowiak currently coaches with North Carolina FC Youth (2019), where he plans to retire.

References

External links
 Rutgers–Newark: Wotjek Krakowiak
 

1976 births
Living people
American soccer coaches
American soccer players
Polish emigrants to the United States
Charleston Battery players
Clemson Tigers men's soccer players
Major League Soccer players
New Jersey Stallions players
Polish footballers
Polish expatriate footballers
San Jose Earthquakes players
St. John's Red Storm men's soccer players
Tampa Bay Mutiny players
A-League (1995–2004) players
Clifton High School (New Jersey) alumni
Sportspeople from Clifton, New Jersey
Sportspeople from Kielce
All-American men's college soccer players
Association football midfielders
Hermann Trophy men's winners